Kavin Dave (born 12 November 1984) is an Indian film and television actor. He works in Bollywood and Gujarati films. Dave made his big screen debut in the movie Mumbai Meri Jaan in 2008. This was followed by further successful films including My Name Is Khan, I Hate Luv Storys, Crook, Shirin Farhad Ki Toh Nikal Padi and Kick. Dave recently played the lead role in the film Bumboo. After featuring in several television commercials for popular brands including Sprite, Vodafone, Dish TV, Fortune oil, Sil jam and Center shock, he landed a series regular role in the television sitcom Rishta.com. Dave made his Tollywood debut with the Telugu film Money Money, More Money.
His instagram account is kavindaveofficial.

Filmography 
 Scam 1992 - The Harshad Mehta Story (2020) - Rakesh Jhunjhunwala
 Gujarat 11 - Gujarati Film (2019)
 Ishqedarriyaan (2015)
Siyaasat (2014) - Qutubuddin Koka
 3 A.M. (2014)
 Bey Yaar, a Gujarati film (2014)
 Kick (2014)
Chemistry (2013)
 Shirin Farhad Ki Toh Nikal Padi (2012)
 Kyaa Super Kool Hain Hum (2012)
 Bumboo (2012)
 Money Money, More Money Telugu film (2011)
 Crook: It's Good to Be Bad (2010)
 I Hate Luv Storys (2010)
 Teen Patti (2010)
 My Name Is Khan (2010)
 Bedundh – a Marathi film (2009)
 Mumbai Meri Jaan (2008)
 Jai Hanuman (1997) – Bal Hanuman and Bal Raavan 
 Filmy Chakkar (1993-1996) - Bunty
 Junoon (1994–98) as vishal rajvansh (child actor)

References

External links 
 
 

Living people
Male actors in Hindi cinema
Male actors in Gujarati-language films
1984 births
Indian male television actors
Indian male film actors
21st-century Indian male actors
Gujarati people